Joint operations can mean:

 Joint warfare, the basis of modern military doctrine
More loosely, Combined arms, an element of joint warfare
 Literal operations on joints of the body, see Orthopedic surgery
 Joint Operations: Typhoon Rising, a video game, and its expansion packs

See also 
 Joint Operations Cell, a British law enforcement collaboration
 Joint Operations Division, component of the South African National Defence Force
 Joint Operations Command (disambiguation), the name of numerous military organizations